Oxaprotiline (developmental code name C 49-802 BDA), also known as hydroxymaprotiline, is a norepinephrine reuptake inhibitor belonging to the tetracyclic antidepressant (TeCA) family and is related to maprotiline. Though investigated as an antidepressant, it was never marketed.

Pharmacology
Dextroprotiline acts as a potent norepinephrine reuptake inhibitor and H1 receptor antagonist, as well as a very weak α1-adrenergic receptor antagonist. It has negligible affinity for the serotonin transporter, dopamine transporter, α2-adrenergic receptor, and muscarinic acetylcholine receptors. Whether it has any antagonistic effects on the 5-HT2, 5-HT7, or D2 receptors like its relative maprotiline is unclear.

Levoprotiline acts as a selective H1 receptor antagonist, with no affinity for adrenaline, dopamine, muscarinic acetylcholine, or serotonin receptors, or any of the monoamine transporters.

Chemistry
Oxaprotiline is a racemic compound composed of two isomers, R(−)- or levo- oxaprotiline (levoprotiline; CGP-12,103-A), and S(+)- or dextro- oxaprotiline (dextroprotiline; CGP-12,104-A). Both enantiomers are active, with the levo- form acting as an antihistamine and the dextro- form having an additional pharmacology (see above), but with both unexpectedly still retaining antidepressant effects.

See also
 Maprotiline

References

Secondary alcohols
Amines
Anthracenes
Tetracyclic antidepressants